The water skiing events at the 2001 World Games in Akita was played between 23 and 25 August. 73 athletes, from 25 nations, participated in the tournament. The water skiing competition took place at Ogata Water Ski Course.

Participating nations

Medal table

Events

Men's events

Women's events

References

External links
 International Waterski and Wakeboard Federation
 Water skiing on IWGA website
 Results

Ōgata, Akita
 
2001 World Games
2001